There are 3 non-trivial stellations of the dodecahedron:
Small stellated dodecahedron
Great dodecahedron
Great stellated dodecahedron

Polyhedral stellation